Robert Higgins Hughes (born November 26, 1925 - January 13, 2017) was an American politician. He served as a Democratic member in the Texas House of Representatives from 1957 to 1963.

References

1925 births
2017 deaths
Members of the Texas House of Representatives